Pelosia is a genus of moths in the family Erebidae. The genus was erected by Jacob Hübner in 1819.

Species
 Pelosia amaurobapha (Mabille, 1900)
 Pelosia ankaratrae (Toulgoët, 1954)
 Pelosia angusta (Staudinger, 1887)
 Pelosia hampsoni (Toulgoët, 1960)
 Pelosia meloui (Toulgoët, 1956)
 Pelosia muscerda (Hufnagel, 1766)
 Pelosia nitedula Durante & Panzera, 2002
 Pelosia noctis (Butler, 1881)
 Pelosia obtusa (Herrich-Schäffer, 1852)
 Pelosia obtusoides (Toulgoët, 1954)
 Pelosia plumosa (Mabille, 1900)
 Pelosia ramosula (Staudinger, 1887)
 Pelosia stictigramma (Hampson, 1908)
 Pelosia tanala (Toulgoët, 1956)

References

 , 1983: Pelosia hellenica sp. n. eine neue Lithosiidae art aus Griechenland (Lepidoptera: Lithosiidae). Entomofauna 4 (20): 253–260.
 , 1959: A systematic study of the Japanese Lithosiinae (Arctiidae) 2. Tyô to Ga 10 (2): 28–29. Full article: .
 , 2011: Lymantriinae and Arctiinae - Including Phylogeny and Check List of the Quadrifid Noctuoidea of Europe. Noctuidae Europaeae Volume 13: 1–448.

External links

Lithosiina
Moth genera